Awaken the Tides is the third album by Malefice released in July 2011 on Metal Blade Records, produced by WellerHill.

Track listing
 "Awaken the Tides" - 4:43
 "Delirium" - 4:13
 "Dead in the Water" - 3:49
 "Minutes" - 5:29
 "Baying for Blood" - 5:30
 "Blessed / Cursed" - 4:22
 "The Day the Sky Fell" - 5:06
 "Out Numbered Out Gunned" - 3:52
 "Flood of Red" - 5:02
 "The Haunting" - 9:55

References

2011 albums
Malefice albums
Metal Blade Records albums
Albums produced by Dan Weller